Most traditional foods in Guatemalan cuisine are based on Maya cuisine, with Spanish influence, and prominently feature corn, chilies and beans as key ingredients. Guatemala is famously home to the Hass avocado.

There are also foods that are commonly eaten on certain days of the week. For example, it is a popular custom to eat paches (a kind of tamale made from potatoes) on Thursday. Certain dishes are also associated with special occasions, such as fiambre for All Saints Day on November 1 and tamales, which are common around Christmas.

History 
Regional Guatemalan cuisine is relatively obscure, due in part to its geographic isolation in volcanic highlands, and also due to the civil war in the second half of the 20th century which discouraged international visitors. Guatemalan cuisine is heavily influenced by Mayan cuisine, with some Spanish influences as well. Many dishes are hyper-regional and are not available outside specific towns.

Maize is an important staple food in Guatemalan cuisine, and has been cultivated in the region since ancient times. Hot chocolate also has a long history in Guatemala. Before the modern era, chocolate was seen as a luxury, and cocoa beans were also used as currency by ancient Mayans. Pork and beef were later introduced by Spanish colonization in the 16th century, supplementing the local meat sources of turkey, other poultry, and fish.

Style 
Many Guatemalan dishes are cooked without the use of cooking oil, with ingredients placed directly on the comal or wrapped in leaves. Many Guatemalan dishes have the suffix '-ik' as part of their name; -ik means chili in several Mayan languages spoken in the country.

Varieties of Guatemalan tamales 

There are reportedly hundreds of varieties of tamales throughout Guatemala. The key variations include the ingredients in the masa or dough (corn, potatoes, rice), in the filling (meat, fruits, nuts), and what it is wrapped with (leaves, husks). Tamales in Guatemala tend to be wrapped in green 'maxan' leaves (Calathea lutea), while chuchitos — which resemble Mexican tamales — are wrapped in corn husks.

The masa is made out of corn that is not sweet, such as what is known as feed corn in the United States. In Guatemala, this non-sweet corn is called maize and the corn that Americans are used to eating on the cob (sweet corn), Guatemalans call elote. Tamales in Guatemala are more typically wrapped in plantain or banana leaves and maxan leaves than corn husks. Additionally Guatemalan tamales use cooked masa, which is prepared in a time-consuming process that requires a significant amount of work.

 Tamales colorados ("red tamales") owe their name to the tomato and achiote (annatto seed) that give them their color, wrapped with corn masa and are stuffed with tomato recado (a flavorful thick sauce), roasted red bell pepper strips, capers, green olives, and chicken, beef or pork.
 Tamales negros ("black tamales") are darker and sweeter than their red counterparts due to the chocolate, raisins, prunes and almonds which are added to them. Other black tamales are not sweet but are simply made out of blue/black corn.
 Tamales de elote ("sweet corn tamales") do not use the typical masa but instead are made out of sweet corn. These may contain whole kernels of corn in the masa and do not generally contain meat.
 Chuchitos ("small dogs") are a very typical kind of Guatemalan tamale made using the same corn masa as a regular tamale but they are smaller, have a much firmer consistency and are wrapped in a tuzas (dried corn husks) instead of plantain leaves. Chuchitos are often accompanied by a simple tomato salsa and sprinkled with a hard, salty white cheese traditional from the Zacapa region. Chuchitos are a very common and are commonly served at luncheons, dinners and celebrations. The masa can be mixed with tomato recado or with a meat broth.
 Tamalitos de masa ("small dough tamales") are smaller than the typical tamales because they are usually plain in taste, with no filling and are used to dip in other foods such as soup, salsa or beans, rather than eaten alone. These tamales are a staple of western Guatemalan cuisine which are favored over the typical tortilla.
 Tamalitos de chipilín and tamales de loroco are other variants of the aforementioned tamales de masa, that have said ingredients added to the mix.
 Paches are a kind of tamal made from potatoes instead of corn.

List of typical foods

Main dishes
 
 Tapado, seafood soup with green plantain and coconut milk
 Chiles rellenos, a blend of shredded meats and peppers, covered in egg batter and fried
 Gallo en perro, spicy  stew ("perro" being slang for "hot/spicy")
 Gallo en chicha, hen/chicken stew
 Garnachas
 Pepián de indio (19th century recipe), meat and vegetable stew in a thick recado sauce
 Subanik, meat and vegetable stew in spicy sauce
 Kak'ik, turkey soup with chili
 Caldo de res or cocido, beef and vegetable soup
 Caldo de gallina, hen soup
 Jocón, chicken stewed in a green sauce
 Hilachas, shredded beef meat in a red sauce
 Güicoyitos rellenos, stuffed zucchini
 Pollo a la cerveza, chicken in a beer sauce
 Pollo guisado, Spanish chicken stew
 Carne guisada, meat stew
 Chuletas fascinante—"fascinating chops", a breaded pan-fried pork chop 
 Ensalada en escabeche, pickled vegetable salad
 Pollo encebollado, chicken in an onion-based sauce
 Estofado, beef, potato and carrot stew
 Revolcado (or "chanfaina"), tomato-based stew with spices and cow’s underbelly
 Pollo en crema, chicken in cream-based sauce
 Carne adobada, adobo marinated preserved beef or pork
 Pulique, yet another kind of meat and vegetable stew
 Suban-ik, chicken and pork stewed in a red sauce inside mashan leaves, often prepared for special occasions
 Enchiladas, tostadas (fried tortillas) stacked with ground beef and vegetables, typically including beets

Rice dishes
There are a variety of rice dishes made in Guatemala. Some include 
 Arroz frito, fried rice 
 Arroz amarillo, plain yellow rice 
 Arroz con vegetales, rice made with different vegetables like corn, carrots and peas.
 Arroz con frijoles, called simply that or in other parts called "casamiento" or "casado", rice with beans (typically black beans).
 Rice and Beans, made with coconut milk
 Arroz con pollo, chicken and rice, similar to paella

Desserts
 Pastel de banano, a type of banana cake
 Tortitas de yuca, yuca latke
 Chancletas de güisquil, sweet chayote covered in whipped egg whites and then fried
 Arroz con leche, the Spanish version of rice pudding
 Atol de elote, sweet corn atole
 Buñuelos, torrejas y molletes, different kinds of sweet bread soaked in syrup, which may or may not have a filling
 Rellenitos de plátano, small balls of mashed plantains filled with sweetened black beans, fried and sprinkled with sugar
 Garbanzos en dulce, chickpeas in sweet thick and mayonnaise like syrup
 Repollitos con dulce de leche Mole de platano, fried plantain slices in a chocolate-based sauce made with several chilies (dessert)

Snacks

 Tamales de frijol con chiltepe Shucos ("dirties"), the Guatemalan version of a hot dog, which often includes guacamole, cabbage, and mayonnaise. This type of hot dog is a native snack only from Guatemala City where it was created.
 Chicharrones y carnitas, fried pork skins and fried pork meat chunks, respectively
 Tostadas de guacamol, frijol, o salsa, fried corn tortilla with guacamole, fried black beans or tomato sauce
 Tacos de carne o pollo, fried rolled up corn tortillas filled with meat or chicken
 Yuca con chicharrón, boiled cassava served with fried pork chunks

Traditional food for Día de todos los Santos (November 1)

 Fiambre, which can be "white" or "red", depending on whether the pickled vegetable salad in it contains beets
 Ayote en dulce, a type of squash boiled in a special sweet syrup
 Jocotes en miel, a variety of Spondias purpurea fruit boiled in syrup
 Empanadas de ayote, a type of squash pastry

OtherAtol maatz, thick corn-based drink flavored with fire ash.Caldo de huevos, an egg-based Consomme typically eaten as a remedy for hangovers.Chirmol ChapínChojín, a version of salpicón made with fried pork skins.
 Guatemalan ceviche of fish, shrimp, snail, clams or a mixture of all.Macuy, a green-colored soup.Puchon-ik, chili-spiced dried fish popular in the city of San Juan.Salpicón, chopped meat, radish and mint leaves served with lemon juice.Tukun-ik'', a corn, egg, and chili soup popular in San Juan.

See also 

 Latin American cuisine
 Indigenous cuisine of the Americas

References

External links 
 

 
Central American cuisine
Latin American cuisine
Mesoamerican cuisine